Vladimír Gýna (born 27 September 1975) is a Czech professional ice hockey player who played with HC Slovan Bratislava in the Slovak Extraliga.

Career statistics

References

Living people
1975 births
Czech ice hockey defencemen
HC Kometa Brno players
HC Litvínov players
HC Most players
HC Slovan Bratislava players
HC Slovan Ústečtí Lvi players
HC Stadion Litoměřice players
KLH Vajgar Jindřichův Hradec players
Motor České Budějovice players
Sportspeople from Most (city)
Piráti Chomutov players
VHK Vsetín players
Czech expatriate ice hockey players in Slovakia